That's Life is a 1966 album by Frank Sinatra, supported by a studio orchestra arranged and conducted by Ernie Freeman.  The album is notable for its title song, "That's Life", which proved to be a top five hit for Sinatra at a time when rock music dominated the music charts. That's Life was released on CD in October 1986.

Track listing
"That's Life" (Dean Kay, Kelly Gordon) – 3:07
"I Will Wait for You" (Michel Legrand, Norman Gimbel, Jacques Demy) – 2:16
"Somewhere My Love (Lara's Theme)" (From Doctor Zhivago) (Paul Francis Webster, Maurice Jarre) – 2:19
"Sand and Sea" (Gilbert Bécaud, Maurice Vidalin, Mack David) – 2:29
"What Now My Love" (Bécaud, Carl Sigman, Pierre Delanoë) – 2:32
"Winchester Cathedral" (Geoff Stephens) – 2:38
"Give Her Love" (Jim Harbert) – 2:14
"Tell Her (You Love Her Each Day)" (Gil Ward, Charles Watkins) – 2:42
"The Impossible Dream (The Quest)" (Joe Darion, Mitch Leigh) – 2:34
"You're Gonna Hear from Me" (André Previn, Dory Previn) – 2:51

Notes
Jacques Demy is also known as Jean Louis Demy
Jim Harbert is also known as James Harbert
Dean Kay is also known as Dean Kay Thompson
The orchestra on “Tell Her (...Each Day)” features 10 violins
The orchestra on “That’s Life” features 12 violins
The orchestra on tracks 2-7 and 9+10 features 8 violins

Certifications

Personnel
Vocalists
Frank Sinatra – lead vocals (all tracks)
Betty Allan – background vocals (8)
Betty Jean Baker – background vocals (1, 8)
Ella Halloran – background vocals (8)
Jack Halloran – background vocals (8)
Gwenn Johnson – background vocals (1)
Bill Kanady – background vocals (8)
Loulie Jean Norman – background vocals (8)
Thurl Ravenscroft – background vocals (8)
Paul Sandberg – background vocals (8)
Jackie Ward – background vocals (1)

Leaders
Ernie Freeman – arranger (all tracks), conductor (1-7, 9–10), piano (8)
Gordon Jenkins – conductor (8)
Donnie Lanier – conductor (1, 3, 5-8)

String section
Chuck Berghofer – string bass (3, 5-8)
Norman Botnick – viola (1)
Ray Brown – string bass (1)
Joseph DiFiore – viola (1)
Joseph DiTullio – cello (1)
Jesse Ehrlich – cello (2-10)
Anne Goodman – cello (8)
Elizabeth Greenschpoon – cello (2-7, 9-10)
Harry Hyams – viola (2, 4, 8-10)
Armand Kaproff – cello (1)
Louis Kievman – viola (2-7, 9-10)
Donald Langley – string bass (2, 4, 9-10)
Alex Neiman – viola (1, 3, 5-8)
Kurt Reher – cello (1)
Emmet Sargeant – cello (8)
Joseph Saxon – cello (8)
Frederick Seykora – cello (1)
Abraham Weiss – viola (1)

Horn section
Louis Blackburn – trombone (all tracks)
Bud Brisbois – trumpet (2, 4, 9-10)
Robert Bryant – trumpet (8)
Pete Carpenter – trombone (8)
Roy Caton – trumpet (8)
Buddy Collette – saxophone, woodwinds (1-2, 4, 9-10)
Chuck Gentry – saxophone, woodwinds (2-7, 9-10)
Bill Green – saxophone, woodwinds (1, 3, 5-7)
Dick Hyde – trombone (1-7, 9-10)
Plas Johnson – saxophone, woodwinds (1, 3, 5-7)
Andreas Kostelas – saxophone, woodwinds (2-7, 9-10)
Cappy Lewis – trumpet (1-7, 9-10)
Lew McCreary – trombone (1, 3, 5-7)
Jay Migliori – saxophone, woodwinds (2, 4, 9-10)
Oliver Mitchell – trumpet (1, 3, 5-7)
Al Porcino – trumpet (2-7, 9-10)
Willie Schwartz – saxophone, woodwinds (1-2, 4-7, 9-10)
Ken Shroyer – bass trombone (2, 4, 9-10)
Anthony Terran – trumpet (all tracks)
David Wells – trombone (2-7, 9-10)

Rhythm section
Hal Blaine – drums (1-2, 4, 8-10)
Eddie Brackett Jr. – drums (3, 5-7), percussion (8, additional on 1)
Russell Bridges – piano (8)
Dennis Budimir – guitar (8)
Frank Capp – percussion (8)
Alvin Casey – acoustic guitar (1)
Gary Coleman – vibes (1)
Victor Feldman – percussion (2, 4, 9-10)
Bobby Gibbons – guitar (2, 4, 9-10)
John Gray – guitar (8)
Lawrence Knechtel – Fender bass (1)
Michael Melvoin – organ (1-7, 9-10)
Bill Miller – piano (all tracks)
Louis Morell – guitar (2-7, 9-10, acoustic on 1)
Bill Pittman – guitar (8)
Ray Pohlman – electric guitar (1)
Emil Richards – percussion (3, 5-8)
Tommy Tedesco – guitar (3, 5-7)

References

1966 albums
Frank Sinatra albums
Reprise Records albums
Albums produced by Jimmy Bowen